Chaudhry Muhammad Shafique is a Pakistani politician who is a Member of the Provincial Assembly of the Punjab, from 2002 to till 2023. He remains Member of Provincial Assembly four times.

Early life and education
He was born on 3 July 1952 in Sadiqabad, Punjab in Famous Chaudhry  Arain Family.

He graduated in 1973 from Government Degree College, Faisalabad .

Political career
He was elected to the Provincial Assembly of the Punjab as a candidate of Pakistan Muslim League (N) (PML-N) from Constituency PP-296 (Rahimyar Khan-XII) in 2002 Pakistani general election.

He was re-elected to the Provincial Assembly of the Punjab as a candidate of PML-N from Constituency PP-296 (Rahimyar Khan-XII) in 2008 Pakistani general election.

He was re-elected to the Provincial Assembly of the Punjab as a candidate of PML-N from Constituency PP-296 (Rahimyar Khan-XII) in 2013 Pakistani general election. In June 2013, he was inducted into the provincial cabinet of Chief Minister Shahbaz Sharif and was made Provincial Minister of Punjab for Industries, Commerce and Investment. In a cabinet reshuffle in November 2016, he was made Provincial Minister of Punjab for Special Education.

He was re-elected to Provincial Assembly of the Punjab as a candidate of PML-N  from Constituency PP-267 (Rahim Yar Khan-XIII) in 2018 Pakistani general election.

References

Living people
Punjab MPAs 2013–2018
1952 births
Pakistan Muslim League (N) politicians
Punjab MPAs 2002–2007
Punjab MPAs 2008–2013
Pakistan Tehreek-e-Insaf MPAs (Punjab)
Punjab MPAs 2018–2023